Hwa Hsia University of Technology (HWH) is a private tertiary technical university located in Zhonghe District, New Taipei, Taiwan. The name makes reference to the Huaxia ethno-cultural group.

History
The institute was founded in 1966 as Hwa Hsia School of Agricultural Technology by Dr. Frank T. Y. Chao (趙聚鈺).

Departments
Hwa Hsia has nine constituent academic departments:
Department of Electronic Engineering
Department of Electrical Engineering
Department of Mechanical Engineering
Department of Chemical Engineering
Department of Computer Science and Information Engineering
Department of Information Management
Department of Assets and Property Management (graduate institute included)
Department of Business Administration
Department of Architecture Department
Department of Digital Media Design
Department of Interior Design
Department of Applied Cosmetology
Biochemical Engineering Department
Construction Management Department

See also
 List of universities in Taiwan

References 

1966 establishments in Taiwan
Educational institutions established in 1966
Universities and colleges in New Taipei
Zhonghe District
Scientific organizations based in Taiwan
Universities and colleges in Taiwan
Technical universities and colleges in Taiwan